Irina Vasilevna Medvedeva  (10 August 1958 – 12 March 2021) was a Russian medical scientist, rector of , Doctor of Medical Sciences, Academician of the Russian Academy of Sciences, Professor, and Honored Scientist of the Russian Federation.

References

20th-century Russian scientists
1958 births
2021 deaths
Full Members of the Russian Academy of Sciences
Honoured Scientists of the Russian Federation
Russian women scientists
20th-century women scientists
21st-century Russian scientists
21st-century women scientists
20th-century Russian women